Geir Inge Lien (born 30 May 1972) is a Norwegian politician for the Centre Party.

He served as a deputy representative to the Parliament of Norway from Møre og Romsdal during the terms 2009–2013, 2013–2017 and 2017–2021. On the local level he became mayor of Vestnes in 2011.

References

1972 births
Living people
People from Vestnes
Deputy members of the Storting
Centre Party (Norway) politicians
Mayors of places in Møre og Romsdal